Almendares may refer to:

 Almendares River, Cuba
 Almendares (baseball), a former club in Havana, Cuba
 Juan Ángel Almendares Bonilla (active from before 2001), Honduran physician, politician and human rights activist

See also